Gary Lewis (born January 14, 1961) was a defensive tackle who played ten seasons in the Canadian Football League.  Previously, he played one season in the NFL for the New Orleans Saints. He won the Grey Cup in 1989 with the Saskatchewan Roughriders.

References

Plaza of Honor inductee

1961 births
Living people
American players of Canadian football
American football defensive linemen
Canadian football defensive linemen
New Orleans Saints players
Ottawa Rough Riders players
Saskatchewan Roughriders players
Oklahoma State Cowboys football players
Sportspeople from Oklahoma City
Players of American football from Oklahoma